Cycling at the 1962 Asian Games was held in Jakarta, Indonesia between 25 August and 2 September 1962. Two races were held in this competition, the first race was 159 kilometres and the second race (as open road race) was 180 kilometres. The second race results also counted for team road race competition.

Medalists

Medal table

References 

 The Straits Times, August 26 – September 2, 1962
 Results

External links
Medalists Road

 
1962 Asian Games events
1962
Asian Games
1962 Asian Games
1962 in road cycling
1962 in track cycling